The Iranian ambassador in Amman is the official representative of the Government in Tehran to the Government of Jordan.

List of representatives

See also
Iran–Jordan relations

References 

 
Jordan
Iran